Les Houches is a commune in the Haute-Savoie department in the Auvergne-Rhône-Alpes region of Eastern France. In 2017, it had a population of 2,943.

Overview
Les Houches, located 6 kilometres from Chamonix, is a ski resort with a domain which extends from an altitude of 950 metres up to 1900 metres. Long descents through tree-lined slopes are combined with impressive views of the Mont Blanc massif and the Chamonix valley.

Les Houches is twinned with the Russian villages of Sochi and Krasnaya-Polyana and was chosen by the International Olympic Committee to assist in the organization of the 2014 Winter Olympic Games.

Les Houches is the starting- and finishing-point of the popular Tour du Mont Blanc, a 7- to 10-day walk around the base of the Mont-Blanc Massif which takes in France, Italy, and Switzerland.

Skiing
The Les Houches pistes are regularly used for international events, most notably the 'Kandahar' run, which is used annually for the Men's Downhill World Cup Ski Championships. Les Houches provides a training ground for the French National Ski Team and the Ski Club of Great Britain. The skiing area consists of one international black run, 12 red runs, five blue runs, and four green runs as well as cross-country trails and two snow parks. It is served by 1 cable car (Bellevue), 1 gondola lift (Prarion), 8 chair lifts (all four-person), 3 drag lifts, a rope pull and a moving carpet, as well as two further drag lifts in the "Le Tourchet" village-centre ski area.

Extensive artificial snow coverage is provided by a new network of 67 snow canons covering 19 hectares. There are nursery slopes at Le Tourchet in the centre of the village itself, a Jardin du Neige for very young children skiers next to Lac de Chavants, and a new nursery area at the top of the Prarion lift.

École de Physique des Houches 
The village is home to a famous physics summer school (the École de Physique des Houches), founded by Cécile DeWitt-Morette. It has been attended by two dozen Nobel prize laureates, either as teachers or as students before they received their prize.  Additionally, the Les Houches Accords, which are important in high energy physics, were written here.

Coupeau and La Flatière
Opposite Les Houches (across the River Arve, but forming part of the commune) is the small village of Coupeau. A circuitous road climbs high through the village and leads for some three miles all the way up to the foot of its own mountain, l'Aiguillette, at the foot of which lies another small village, La Flatière, well known across the valley for its panoramic views, and a little Christian hermitage. From here many paths wander through the mountains. One scenic path leads to an old sheepfold, called Chailloux.
 
Coupeau has sun all year round, whereas Les Houches for the most part, remains in the shade in the winter. At the heart of the village of Coupeau is the Merlet animal park, which draws many visitors each year. Here visitors can see llamas as well as local types of deer, rams, and marmots. Below the animal park, a four-storey high statue of Jesus Christ overlooks the valley, its right arm outstretched as if greeting newcomers entering the valley below.

Sister cities
 Krasnaya Polyana, Sochi, Russia

Notable people
Itamar Biran (born 1998) - Israeli Olympic alpine ski racer, lives and trains in Les Houches.
 Professor Jean Delumeau, historian, stays frequently in Les Houches, where he practises mountaineering.
 Catherine Destivelle, mountaineer.
 Pierre-Gilles de Gennes, Nobel Prize for Physics, came to study and teach at the Physics School of Les Houches (l'École de Physique des Houches).
 Marie Paradis (1778-1839), the first woman to climb Mont Blanc (in July 1808).

Sights and attractions
 The Bellevue chair lift (entered service in 1936)
 The Statue of Jesus Christ (inaugurated 19 August 1934)
 The Musée Montagnard, housed in an 18th-century building, which has as its theme of the traditional mountain habitat

Gallery

See also
Communes of the Haute-Savoie department
Les Houches Accords

References

External links

 Les Houches Tourism Office 
 Official site of largest mountain infrastructure in the Chamonix valley - first hand lift & piste info, lift passes, avalanche risk, etc 
 l'École de Physique des Houches 

Communes of Haute-Savoie
Ski resorts in France